Steve Callaway is an American politician who is the 42nd mayor of Hillsboro, Oregon, a position he has held since January 2017.

Biography
Callaway went to high school at Oroville High School in Oroville, California, before earning his bachelor's degree at Point Loma Nazarene University in San Diego. He then moved to Oregon where he earned a master's degree from Lewis & Clark College, and settled in Hillsboro in 1995 where he later served as the principal at Tobias Elementary School in the Hillsboro School District.

Callaway served on the Hillsboro City Council from 2010 until he was sworn in as mayor on January 3, 2017. Callaway was elected mayor in November 2016.

References

External links
 City Council Spotlight: Mayor Steve Callaway

Living people
21st-century American politicians
Hillsboro City Council members (Oregon)
Mayors of Hillsboro, Oregon
Place of birth missing (living people)
Year of birth missing (living people)
Politicians from Oroville, California
Lewis & Clark College alumni
Point Loma Nazarene University alumni
American school principals